Thaddeus Stevens Elementary School (also known as Thaddeus Stevens School, and Pittsburgh Stevens K-8) located at 824 Crucible Street in the Elliott neighborhood of Pittsburgh, Pennsylvania, was built in 1939. It was a part of Pittsburgh Public Schools and served Elliott, Esplen, Sheraden, West End, and Westgate Village.

The school was designed by Marion M. Steen (1886–1966) in Art Deco style.  The school was named in honor of Republican abolitionist Thaddeus Stevens, who was a U.S. Congressman from Pennsylvania. It was added to the List of Pittsburgh History and Landmarks Foundation Historic Landmarks in 2001, and the List of City of Pittsburgh historic designations on November 30, 1999. In 2012, Stevens celebrated its final year of operation.

References

External links

 

Schools in Pittsburgh
Art Deco architecture in Pennsylvania
School buildings completed in 1939
Public elementary schools in Pennsylvania
1939 establishments in Pennsylvania